Helmut Gerlach (born 7 June 1937) is a German cross-country skier. He competed in the men's 15 kilometre event at the 1968 Winter Olympics.

References

1937 births
Living people
German male cross-country skiers
Olympic cross-country skiers of West Germany
Cross-country skiers at the 1968 Winter Olympics
People from Wałbrzych County
20th-century German people